Bishop Auckland Football Club is a football club based in Bishop Auckland, County Durham, England. They are one of the most successful amateur sides, having won the FA Amateur Cup ten times and reached the final on a further eight occasions. Nicknamed 'The Bishops' or 'The Two Blues', they are rivals with West Auckland Town.

History

Formation and early years  
Football in Bishop Auckland can be traced back to 1882 when theological students from Cambridge and Oxford Universities studying at Auckland Castle, home to the Bishop of Durham in Bishop Auckland, formed a team known as Bishop Auckland Church Institute. The founding students chose Cambridge and Oxford Blue as the club's colours to reflect the origins of the new team.
A later dispute caused a breakaway team called Auckland Town in 1886 and it was from this upheaval that Bishop Auckland Football Club was eventually born. Eight days after its formation, the club initially chose royal blue with white facings for the playing kit and subsequently changed to the more familiar light (Cambridge) and dark (Oxford) blue colours of the original Church Institute later, representing the colours of Oxbridge, and the origins of football in Bishop Auckland.

In 1889 Auckland Town were one of the 10 founding members of the World's second-oldest football league –  the Northern League. The inaugural season was largely uneventful with the team finishing 8th with the league's first winners being St. Augustine's (Darlington).
Between the years of 1891 and 1893 the team never participated in league football but it was during this time that the club won its first silverware – the Durham County Challenge Cup – in 1892.

The team name was changed in 1893 to Bishop Auckland and it was under this name that the football club rejoined the Northern League. The following two seasons under the new name were again uneventful as the club finished third bottom on both occasions.

During the 1895–96 season Bishop Auckland won their first silverware on a national scale – the Amateur Cup – defeating Royal Artillery Portsmouth 8–0 in the final. Over the following few seasons the team steadily improved their league position and in 1898–99 won the Northern League championship for the first time. It was also during 1899 that Bishop Auckland picked up their second Durham County Challenge Cup.

It was clear that Bishop Auckland was an appealing prospect for the region's talented footballers as the Northern League was won a further five times (and shared with Sunderland 'A' in 1905–06) and the Amateur Cup final was reached a further six times (beating Lowestoft Town 5–1 in 1900 and Northern Nomads 1–0 in 1914) before football was suspended due to World War I.

After the war, Bishop Auckland picked up where they left off finishing as league runners-up to South Bank in 1919–20, winning the following season and runners-up again the following two seasons.
During this time the Amateur Cup was added twice more with wins over Swindon Victoria (4–2, 1921) and South Bank (5–2 (aet), 1922).

The next honour was won nearly a decade later when the league championship was added in 1931 along the Durham County Challenge Cup. In 1935 the Amateur Cup final was reached again with Wimbledon being defeated 2–1 in a replay after the original tie finished goalless after extra time.

The Bishops had perhaps their best-ever season in 1938–39 when they completed a treble. Future Liverpool player and manager Bob Paisley played at right-back in the team which won the Northern League title, the Durham County Challenge Cup and the FA Amateur Cup. The Amateur Cup final was played in Durham at Roker Park where the Bishops defeated Wellington 3–0 after extra time.

Following World War II Bishop Auckland reached the Amateur Cup final for the eleventh time but went down 3–2 against Barnet.
The following season, 1946–47, another Northern League title was added with Crook Colliery Welfare runners-up. The team were runners-up the following two seasons (1948–49), to Ferryhill Athletic and Evenwood Town respectively.

Glory days 
The 1950s were to be Bishop Auckland's best with the Northern League title won in the first three seasons with Billingham Synthonia being the runners-up on each occasion. Bishop and Willington both reached the final of the Amateur Cup in 1950, Willington producing a shock to triumph 4–0 over their more glamorous neighbours and take the Cup back to County Durham. The following season the Amateur Cup final was reached again. The opponents were Pegasus and again Bishops had to settle for a runners-up medal as Pegasus were the victors after a 2–1 win. In '53 Bishop were runners-up to Crook Town in the league but added the title another three times over the next three seasons ('54, '55 and '56), with Crook Town being runners-up on each occasion. In '54 the Amateur Cup final was again reached, this time Crook Town were the opponents and it was the Black and Ambers that triumphed after a narrow 1–0 win.

The next three seasons were unprecedented in Amateur Cup history. Not only did Bishops reach the final on each occasion, but also finished the victors on each occasion. The opponents being; '55 Hendon (2–0), '56 Corinthian-Casuals (1–1 (aet), 4–1) and '57 Wycombe Wanderers (3–1). The latter being Bishops last appearance in the Amateur Cup final.
That wasn't the last of the silverware in the 1950s, however. The Durham County Challenge Cup was again added in 1956.

Bishop Auckland FC's best footballing performance was arguably played in the 1954–55 season in which they won the Northern League Division One, the Northern League Cup, the FA Amateur Cup and reached the 4th round in the FA Cup losing only to York City who then went on to lose to Newcastle United in the semi-final.
Bishop Auckland were a truly remarkable football team in this era, they have played at Wembley on numerous occasions and had a huge number of fans supporting them. The 1954–55 FA Amateur Cup final saw the crowd reach 100,000 – the last occasion an amateur match attracted such a crowd.
The Bishops team of this era contained many quality players that eventually found their way into the professional game. Seamus O'Connell, a forward, went on to play for Chelsea in the 1954–55 season, other players – Derek Lewin, Bob Hardisty and Warren Bradley – went on to play for Manchester United following the Munich air disaster and earned international caps at both amateur and professional level, most notably Warren Bradley who is the only English player to have done this in the same season.

In 1960, Bishops were league runners-up to near-neighbours West Auckland Town, but the league title was again won in '67, along with the league cup and the Durham County Challenge Cup being added to the one won in '62.

The 1970s were a lean decade for the club in terms of silverware, the league cup being the only competition the club won in the 1975–76 season.

Bishops had to wait until the 1980s until their next piece of silverware – a league and county cup double being added in '85 and '86.
After finishing 6th in 1988 it was decided by the club's hierarchy that a higher level of league football was necessary for the club to grow. Bishops left the Northern League for the second time and joined the Northern Premier League. Again, the Durham County Challenge Cup was won this season.

Promotion to Premier Division
In their debut season in the Northern Premier League the team made their mark in the First Division and finished as runners-up – winning promotion to the Premier Division in the process.
The team more than held their own over the following seasons with the club's highest position in the pyramid being achieved in 1997 – 2nd in the Premier League of the Northern Premier League. The county cup was again won this season.

In 2002, the club suffered its first relegation in its history despite not finishing in a relegation place. Bishops were relegated by the Northern Premier League on a ground technicality.

Bishops battled back and again found themselves in the Premier Division following the 2004 restructuring of the non-league pyramid. However, with the ground situation continuing and a percentage of the playing budget being taken up by rent towards Spennymoor United and Shildon, it proved difficult in attracting the quality of player necessary to maintain a place in the Northern Premier League. The following season Bishops suffered their second successive relegation and returned to the Northern League for the 2006–07 season.

Return to the Northern League 
Bishops returned to the Northern League still in a groundsharing agreement with Shildon. This would prove to have an important bearing on the playing budget available to the manager as the club fought to balance the books following relegation. Whilst the manager was confident of a good season, it was clear from early in the season that Bishop were not to be challengers at the top of the table. A solid, if unspectacular, league campaign ended with the Blues finishing 18 points above the drop zone in 16th place.

The following season proved to be even more difficult. With the club having to further reduce the playing budget and as a result performances on the field took a turn for the worse. The season ended with the club in 20th place. Normally, this would have resulted in relegation but with Durham City electing to take promotion to the Northern Premier League, Bishops were spared so the first division of the Northern League could continue with 22 clubs.

Season 2008–09 proved to be better both on and off the pitch and the club entered a groundsharing agreement with West Auckland Town. Whilst the league campaign got off to a disastrous start, the club's plans for a new ground were given the go-ahead in November, but the club were rooted to the bottom of the league. The board decided to take action and a new manager, Colin Myers, was appointed in February. Prior to Colin's first game the Blues were ten points adrift of safety. Over the next twenty games the team gained 26 points to eventually finish the season in 18th place – seven points clear of the relegation zone. A truly remarkable turnaround with only a few additions to the playing squad.

Season-by-season record

First team squad

Players out on Dual Registration

Players Dual signed with First team and Resevres

Youth set up
Bishop Auckland F.C currently have an Under 23s who completed their first season in the Durham County FA U23's League South Division, this team leads to a number of players making the step up to the Bishop's first team.

Bishop Auckland FC also has an under 18s team who won the league in their only season TJFA Division 1. The under 18s will take part in the FA Youth Cup this is the first time the club has ever had a team enter the FA Youth Cup, The Under 18s made their FA Youth Cup Debut on Thursday 2 September, Drawing 1–1 against Workington with Alex O'Hagan scoring, but then losing 3–2 on Penalties

The Former Under 18s team became Bishop Auckland XI joining the Wearside league 3, to give young players a chance to get senior football experience while keeping them in the Bishop's system.

Bishops are closely connected to St Mary's FC who are seen by everyone as their youth set up. In recent times, a number of players have made debuts coming through the whole set-up, such as former player Darren Richardson, but a number of players joined later and have gone on to sign for the club.

Backroom staff

Board members

Bishop Auckland Ladies
Bishop Auckland Ladies are the Official Ladies Team for Bishop Auckland FC. Formed in May 2013, Bishop Auckland Ladies Development Team was set up in May 2015, with the aim to provide female players, a place to develop before taking the step up to first-team football, and in recent times has been used as a tool to scout players for the Senior team.
 
Bishop Auckland Ladies currently play in the North-East Region Women's Football League Division One North, gaining promotion in the 2020 season, they were 6th in the league when it was suspended in the 2020/21 season. In 21/22 Bishop Ladies finished 7th place in the North-East Region Women's Football League Division One North

The Ladies First Team Squad

Ground
Between the years of 1886 and 2001 Bishop Auckland played their home matches at Kingsway, a ground shared with the town's cricket club. The club moved out of Kingsway with plans to move into a purpose-built stadium at Tindale Crescent out of the town centre, but still in the conurbation of Bishop Auckland. Plans were submitted to Wear Valley District Council in early September 2008, planning permission was granted in mid-November 2008 and the club moved into the 2,004 capacity ground in October 2010. While waiting for the ground to be constructed, the club groundshared at West Auckland Town's Darlington Road for 2008–09, 2009–10 and part of the 2010–11 seasons. They also had stints at Dean Street, home of Shildon, between 2002–04 and 2006–08 and at Brewery Field, Spennymoor, home of Spennymoor Town, between the spells at Shildon.

The current attendance record at Heritage Park is 2,004 for the game between Bishop Auckland and Darlington F.C. in August 2012.

Honours
FA Amateur Cup
Winners 1895–96, 1899–1900, 1913–14, 1920–21, 1921–22, 1934–35, 1938–39, 1954–55, 1955–56, 1956–57
Northern League
Division One champions 1898–99, 1900–01, 1901–02, 1908–09, 1909–10, 1911–12, 1920–21, 1930–31, 1938–39, 1946–47, 1949–50, 1950–51, 1951–52, 1953–54, 1954–55, 1955–56, 1966–67, 1984–85, 1985–86
League Cup winners 1949–50, 1950–51, 1952–53, 1953–54, 1954–55, 1959–60, 1966–67, 1975–76
Amateur Champions 1905–06
Durham Challenge Cup
Winners 1891–92, 1898–99, 1930–31, 1938–39, 1951–52, 1955–56, 1961–62, 1966–67, 1984–85, 1985–86, 1987–88, 1996–97, 1998–99, 2000–01, 2001–02, 2012–13

Records
Highest league position: 2nd in the Northern Premier League Premier Division, 1996–97
Best FA Cup performance: Fourth round, 1954–55
Best FA Amateur Cup performance: Winners, 1895–96, 1899–1900, 1900–01, 1913–14, 1920–21, 1921–22, 1934–35, 1938–39, 1954–55, 1955–56, 1956–57
Best FA Trophy performance: Quarter-finals, 1978–79, 1996–97, 1999–2000
Best FA Vase performance: Second round, 2014–15
Record attendance: 17,000 vs Coventry City, FA Cup second round, 1952
Most appearances: Bob Hardisty
Top goal scorer of all time: Andrew Johnson – 249 goals

See also
Bishop Auckland F.C. players
Bishop Auckland F.C. managers

References

External links

Bishop Auckland at the official Northern League website

 
Football clubs in England
Football clubs in County Durham
Association football clubs established in 1886
1886 establishments in England
F.C.
Northern Football League
Northern Premier League clubs